Instow is an unincorporated community within the Rural Municipality of Bone Creek No. 108, Saskatchewan, Canada. The community is located on Highway 13 also known as the historic Red Coat Trail, about 10 km northeast of the town of Shaunavon.

Demographics

Instow, like so many other small farming communities throughout Saskatchewan, has struggled to maintain a sturdy population causing Instow to become a complete ghost town with few to no residents. Prior to January 1, 2002, Instow was incorporated under village status, but was dissolved into an unincorporated community under the jurisdiction of the Rural municipality of Bone Creek on that date.

In 2006, Instow had a population of 1 living in 1 dwellings, a 0% decrease from 2001.

History

Early years

Instow was once a small community founded in 1914 with the building of the Canadian Pacific Railway. C. Herbert, the first post master and founder of the small community, decided to name it after the small town of Instow, England, where he was originally from. During Instow's boom years in 1923 the town grew to a peak of 60 citizens and was incorporated to village status. After incorporation, streetlights were installed throughout the village, and a well, sidewalks, a skating rink, a seven-metre snow slide for winter sports and a ball diamond were built. The village even had a its very own fire engine, two general stores, a restaurant, a bank, a livery barn, a lumberyard, a community hall, an implement agency, a post office, a garage, a telephone office, a  blacksmith, a pool hall, and a total of five grain elevators.

Decline

In 1951 Instow's Village Council decided it would be best for the village to dissolve into an unincorporated community due to the rapid decline in its population. The community was struck once again with the closure of the post office in 1963. Over time many of the buildings in Instow have either been moved, demolished or simply rotted away, leaving very little to nothing of the community remaining.

See also
 List of communities in Saskatchewan
 Ghost towns in Saskatchewan

References

Bone Creek No. 108, Saskatchewan
Former villages in Saskatchewan
Unincorporated communities in Saskatchewan
Ghost towns in Saskatchewan
Populated places established in 1914
1914 establishments in Saskatchewan
Division No. 4, Saskatchewan